A List of churches in Scotland by council area:

 Aberdeen
 Aberdeenshire
 Angus
 Argyll and Bute
 Clackmannanshire
 Dumfries and Galloway
 Dundee
 East Ayrshire
 East Dunbartonshire
 East Lothian
 East Renfrewshire
 Edinburgh
 Falkirk
 Fife
 Glasgow
 Highland
 Inverclyde
 Midlothian
 Moray
 Na h-Eileanan Siar (Western Isles)
 North Ayrshire
 North Lanarkshire
 Orkney
 Perth and Kinross
 Renfrewshire
 Scottish Borders
 Shetland
 South Ayrshire
 South Lanarkshire
 Stirling
 West Dunbartonshire
 West Lothian

See also

List of collegiate churches in Scotland
List of Church of Scotland synods and presbyteries
List of Church of Scotland parishes